The Gymnopédies, or Trois Gymnopédies, are three piano compositions written by French composer and pianist Erik Satie. He completed the whole set by 2 April 1888, but they were at first published individually: the first and the third in 1888, the second in 1895.

History

The work's unusual title comes from the French form of gymnopaedia, the ancient Greek word for an annual festival where young men danced naked – or perhaps simply unarmed. The source of the title has been a subject of debate. Satie and his friend Alexis Roland-Manuel maintained that he adopted it after reading Gustave Flaubert's novel Salammbô, while others see a poem by J. P. Contamine de Latour as the source of Satie's inspiration, since the first Gymnopédie was published in the magazine La Musique des familles in the summer of 1888 together with an excerpt of Latour's poem Les Antiques, where the term appears.

However, it remains uncertain whether the poem was composed before the music. Satie may have picked up the term from a dictionary such as Dominique Mondo's Dictionnaire de Musique, where gymnopédie is defined as a "nude dance, accompanied by song, which youthful Spartan maidens danced on specific occasions", following a similar definition from Jean-Jacques Rousseau's Dictionnaire de Musique.

In November 1888, the third Gymnopédie was published. The second Gymnopédie did not appear until 1895, and its impending publication was announced in several editions of the Chat Noir and Auberge du Clou magazines. As a whole, the three pieces were published in 1898.

Pierre Puvis de Chavannes' symbolist paintings may have been an inspiration for the atmosphere Satie wanted to evoke with his Gymnopédies.

Music
These short, atmospheric pieces are written in  time, with each sharing a common theme and structure.

The melodies of the pieces use deliberate, but mild, dissonances against the harmony, producing a piquant, melancholy effect that matches the performance instructions, which are to play each piece "painfully" (douloureux), "sadly" (triste), or "gravely" (grave). The first few bars of Gymnopédie No. 1 (shown below) consist of an alternating progression of two major seventh chords, the first on the subdominant, G, and the second on the tonic, D.

Reception
By the end of 1896, Satie's popularity was waning and financial situation deteriorating. Claude Debussy, a friend of Satie's whose popularity was on the rise, helped draw public attention to Satie’s work. In February 1897, Debussy orchestrated the third and first Gymnopédies.

Legacy
From the second half of the 20th century on, the Gymnopédies were often erroneously described as part of Satie's body of furniture music, perhaps because of John Cage's interpretation of them. Collectively, the Gymnopédies are regarded as an important precursor to modern ambient music.

The first and second Gymnopédies were arranged by Dick Halligan for the group Blood, Sweat & Tears under the title "Variations on a Theme by Erik Satie" on the group's eponymous album, released in 1968. The recording received a Grammy Award the following year for Best Contemporary Instrumental Performance. In 1980, Gary Numan produced a track called " (First Movement)", which appeared on the B-side of the single "We Are Glass". A sample of Gymnopédie No. 1 is featured in the 2001 Janet Jackson single "Someone to Call My Lover", peaking at number 3 on the Billboard Hot 100. Gymnopédies have been heard in numerous movies and television shows. Examples include the documentary Man on Wire, Wes Anderson's The Royal Tenenbaums, and Woody Allen's Another Woman, all of which use Gymnopédie No. 1 in their soundtracks. The 2010 Japanese animated drama film The Disappearance of Haruhi Suzumiya prominently features all three Gymnopédies, and they are included in the film's soundtrack release as a bonus disc, including Satie's Gnossiennes and his composition "Je te veux". Mother 3 also features Gymnopédie No. 1 in its soundtrack as Leder's Gymnopedie. In 2007,  arranged the first and the third Gymnopédie for The 12 Cellists of the Berlin Philharmonic. Jack DeJohnette included a tribute to Gymnopédies in his 2016 album Return. In 2018, Fernando Perdomo included a portion of Gymnopedie No. 1 on his album Out to Sea. In 2021, violinist Fenella Humphreys released an arrangement of Gymnopedie No.1 for violin.

Notes & references

External links

 
 
 Public Domain sheet music of the Gymnopédies, Mutopia Project 

 
1888 compositions
Compositions by Erik Satie
Compositions for solo piano
Ancient Greece in art and culture